Nexen Tire Corporation is a tire manufacturer headquartered in Yangsan, South Gyeongsang Province and Seoul in South Korea. Established in 1942 under the name, Heung-A Tire Company, Nexen Tire Co. has served the industry for the past 71 years. 

In 1985, Nexen dedicated a facility in Yangsan, Korea, to the production of radial tires.

The company changed their name in 2000 from Woosung Tire to Nexen Tire Corporation.  That same year also saw Nexen Tire listed on the KOSPI 200 Index future market.

In 2005, Nexen Tire was awarded a patent for the technology to manufacture rubber/stratified silicate nano-composite tires. By 2006, they had completed development on the new UHP and Winter LTR/SUV pattern. To accommodate increased demand, the company opened a manufacturing plant in Qingdao, China in 2007. Nexen's domestic market share increased from 8% to 20%, with annual sales exceeding $600 million. The company employs over 2,000 and currently exports to 120 countries. Its major Korean competitors are Hankook and Kumho. 

The company's name, a portmanteau of next and century is reflected in its marketing tagline, "Next Century Tire."

Products
N2000, N3000, N5000, N6000, N7000, and N8000, N9000, NFERA SU1, NFERA SU4, NFERA SUR4 NFERA RU5, NBLUE HD, NBLUE HD Plus, NBLUE Eco, CP661, Capitol and more than 30 other passenger car and light truck tires.

Sponsorship
Nexen has been a sponsor of Manchester City F.C. since 2015. Nexen became Manchester City's first sleeve sponsor in 2017. The sleeve sponsorship was extended to the men's training kit, Manchester City W.F.C.'s kit for all domestic competition and Manchester City Esports kit in 2020.

Fredric Aasbø was a Nexen-sponsored competitor in Formula D, finishing runner-up in 2016, 2017, 2018 and 2019. Other notable Nexen drifters include Ken Gushi (2016-2017, 2021-present), Tanner Foust (2016), Chris Forsberg (2018-2020), and Ryan Tuerck (2018).

See also
Economy of South Korea
Korea New Network - Nexen Tire is the biggest shareholder of this channel.
Nexen Heroes - Nexen Tire, the biggest sponsor, has naming rights of the first string of the Heroes Baseball Club.

References

External links 

Tire manufacturers of South Korea
Auto parts suppliers of South Korea
Automotive companies established in 1942
South Korean brands
Chaebol
1942 establishments in Korea